Iêda Maria Brutto Vargas (born December 31, 1944) is a Brazilian actress and beauty queen who was crowned Miss Universe in Miami Beach, Florida in 1963. Previously, she was Miss Brazil and was crowned by Maria Olívia Rebouças. She was the first person from her country to win a major international beauty pageant. Vargas is a native of Rio Grande do Sul. During her term she opened the Capital Plaza Mall in Landover Hills, Maryland, a suburb of Washington, D.C.

See also
Miss Universe 1963
List of Brazilians

References

External links
missesdobrasil.com, in Portuguese 

 

1944 births
Brazilian female models
Living people
Miss Brazil winners
Miss Universe 1963 contestants
Miss Universe winners
People from Rio Grande do Sul